The Battle of Grocka, also known as Battle of Krotzka, was fought between the Habsburg monarchy and the Ottoman Empire on 21–22 July 1739 in Grocka, Belgrade. The Ottomans were victorious and took the city of Belgrade. The battle was part of the Ottoman-Habsburg wars.

Battle

The Habsburgs had direct orders from Emperor Charles VI to engage the enemy at the first possible opportunity.

The Habsburg army broke up camp at Vinča (Zweibrücken) on 20 July between 22:00 and 23:00h and moved south through difficult terrain. On the morning of 21 July, the Imperial cavalry consisting of the Pállfy and Savoy regiments encountered the Turkish army and attacked without waiting for the infantry. The Ottoman forces were better prepared and, outnumbering their opponent, could fire on the Habsburgs from higher hidden positions.

The Habsburg cavalry was then cut off and only the Savoy Regiment was able to break out. When the Habsburg infantry arrived, the battle raged on until nightfall, when the Habsburgs decided to retreat to Vinča. The Ottomans did not pursue.

On 23 July the Habsburgs withdrew further to Belgrade.

The Ottoman Army followed and laid siege to Belgrade, until the Habsburgs signed the Treaty of Belgrade on September 18 and left the city.

In this battle, the Habsburg cavalry alone had suffered 2,142 killed and wounded, between 25 and 50% of their total effectives.

Consequences

The defeat at Grocka had an enormous psychological impact at the Austrian Court. After a series of resounding victories against the Ottomans under Eugene of Savoy, a short and victorious campaign was expected again this time. The unexpected defeat made the Habsburgs eager for peace. The Ottoman diplomats took advantage and obtained the very advantageous Treaty of Belgrade, in which all Habsburg conquests in the Balkans were given back, including Belgrade, with the exception of the Banat.

The Habsburg Monarchy paid a high price for neglecting to maintain an efficient army and to look for a worthy successor for Eugene of Savoy. Fieldmarshal Wallis, charged with negligence, was court-martialled and condemned to imprisonment in the castle of Spielberg. He was released three months later, when he was pardoned by the new Empress Maria Theresa of Austria.

References

External links 
 KUK Wehrmacht Die Schlacht bei Grocka am 22.7.1739

Conflicts in 1739
Grocka
Grocka
Grocka
Ottoman Serbia
Russo-Turkish War (1735–1739)
1739 in the Habsburg monarchy